Hisa Sawada (25 November 1897 – 9 November 1979) was a Japanese suffragist and politician. She was one of the first group of women elected to the House of Representatives in 1946.

Biography
Sawada was born in 1897 and was from Tsuchiyama in Shiga Prefecture. After marrying she moved to Kuwana in Mie Prefecture. She became a leader of the women's suffrage movement and chaired the Chūbu Women's Suffrage Acquisition League.

After World War II, Sawada joined the Japan Socialist Party and became head of its women's section in Kuwana. She was a JSP candidate in Mie in the 1946 general elections (the first in which women could vote), and was elected to the House of Representatives. After losing her seat in the 1947 elections, she was a candidate for the Rightist Socialist Party in the 1953 House of Councillors elections, finishing second behind Hiroya Ino with 28% of the vote.

She died in 1979.

References

1897 births
Japanese suffragists
20th-century Japanese women politicians
20th-century Japanese politicians
Members of the House of Representatives (Japan)
Social Democratic Party (Japan) politicians
Rightist Socialist Party of Japan politicians
1979 deaths